The Sea Hunters: True Adventures with Famous Shipwrecks is a nonfiction work by adventure novelist Clive Cussler published in the United States in 1996.  This work details the author's search for famous shipwrecks with his nonprofit organization NUMA.  There is also a television series  titled The Sea Hunters which is based on the book. It airs on the National Geographic Channel and History Television in Canada.

Plot

In 1978 adventure novelist Clive Cussler funded and participated in an attempt to find John Paul Jones's famous Revolutionary warship, the USS Bonhomme Richard.  The expedition was not successful; however, it eventually led to the formation of a nonprofit organization named after the fictional agency in his novels, the National Underwater and Marine Agency, and dedicated to the discovery of famous shipwrecks around the world.  In The Sea Hunters, Cussler documents the search for nine famous shipwrecks while also offering dramatized imaginings on the events that led up to the loss of the ship.  To date, the group's most successful find is the (disputed) discovery of the final resting place of the Confederate submarine Hunley, detailed in Part 6.  The Hunley was later raised and is now on public display.

Contents

Part 1: The Steamboat Lexington
Part 2: The Republic of Texas Navy ship Zavala
Part 3:  and CSS Florida
Part 4: CSS Arkansas
Part 5: 
Part 6: The Confederate Submarine H. L. Hunley
Part 7: The Lost Locomotive of Kiowa Creek
Part 9: The Troop Transport 
Part 10: A listing of the sixty-four shipwreck sites documented by the National Underwater and Marine Agency

Release details
1996, USA, Simon & Schuster 0-684-83027-2, October 7, 1996, Hardcover.
1997, USA, Pocket 0-671-00180-9, August 1, 1997, Paperback.

References
Notes

External links
 - Official Website of Clive Cussler
 - NUMA Official Website - National Underwater Marine Agency

1996 non-fiction books
Archaeology of shipwrecks
Books by Clive Cussler
Books with cover art by Paul Bacon
Collaborative non-fiction books